Sir Thomas de Brus (c. 1284 – 17 February 1307) was a younger brother and supporter of King Robert I of Scotland, in the struggle against the English conquest. He was captured by the MacDoualls at Loch Ryan, Galloway, Scotland and later executed by the English. 
 
Born c. 1284 at Carrick, Ayrshire, Scotland a younger son of Robert de Brus, 6th Lord of Annandale and Margaret, Countess Of Carrick. He was married to Helen Erskine.

Battle of Loch Ryan
During the Scottish Wars of Independence, Thomas and his brother Alexander de Brus, lead a force in support of their brother King Robert I, which landed at Loch Ryan . Along with Malcolm McQuillan, Lord of Kintyre, an Irish sub king, and Sir Reginald de Crawford, they sailed an invasion force of eighteen galleys, and 1000 Irishmen, into the harbor, what ensued would be called the Battle of Loch Ryan. Their force was quickly overwhelmed by Gallowaymen, led by Dungal MacDouall, a supporter of the Balliols, Comyns and King Edward I of England. Only two galleys escaped and all the leaders were captured. The Irish sub king and Malcolm McQuillan were executed immediately. Thomas, Alexander, and Reginald de Crawford were sent to Carlisle, England, where they were hanged, drawn, and beheaded a few days after the battle.

References

1284 births
1307 deaths
Thomas
People executed under the Plantagenets by decapitation
People of the Wars of Scottish Independence
Executed Scottish people